Alto Paraguai is a municipality in the state of Mato Grosso in the Mid-West of Brazil.

See also
List of municipalities in Mato Grosso

References

Municipalities in Mato Grosso